Roland Wlodyka was an American stock car racing driver and mechanic, driving in the NASCAR Winston Cup Series in the 1970s and later crew chiefing in the Cup and Craftsman Truck Series in the 1980s and 1990s.

Racing career
Wlodyka quit drag racing to begin oval track competition in 1970. By the beginning of the 1977 season, Wlodyka had joined Rod Osterlund to drive in the NASCAR Winston Cup Series.  By May 1978, Roland had given up the driver's seat after 11 races  to take on his new role of Team Manager of Osterlund Racing, while Dave Marcis finished out the 1978 season behind the wheel.  For the 1979 season, Wlodyka hired Dale Earnhardt who drove for Osterlund until the conclusion of the 1981 season. In the late 1980s, Wlodyka served as a part-time crew chief in the Cup Series, working with Buddy Baker, Rodney Combs and Hut Stricklin. In the late 1990s, Wlodyka crew chiefed in the NASCAR Craftsman Truck Series, working for Akins-Sutton Motorsports, Circle Bar Racing, Liberty Racing and Phelon Motorsports, working with future Cup champion Kevin Harvick while at Liberty.

Death
Wlodyka died in Lake Wylie, South Carolina on January 30, 2020.

Motorsports career results

NASCAR
(key) (Bold – Pole position awarded by qualifying time. Italics – Pole position earned by points standings or practice time. * – Most laps led.)

Winston Cup Series

References

External links
 
 

1938 births
2020 deaths
Sportspeople from Sunnyvale, California
Racing drivers from California
Racing drivers from San Jose, California
NASCAR drivers
American people of Polish descent